Kiba Lumberg, real name Kirsti Leila Annikki Lumberg (born 27 May 1956), is a Finnish artist and author of Finnish Kale descent. She is known as a critic of the traditional Roma culture.

Biography 
Lumberg was born in Lappeenranta.  She ran away from her family at the age of 13 because of fear, violence, and subjugation. Many of her works are inspired by her childhood experience. Lumberg gained nationwide publicity in 1997 when a television mini-series of the traditional Kale life, based on her screenplay, titled Tumma ja hehkuva veri, was shown on television. In 2007 Lumberg received death threats after criticizing the Romani culture on television.

Along with other prominent members of the Finnish Roma community, Lumberg, percussionist Rainer Friman (fi), and author Veijo Baltzar criticized Miranda Vuolasranta, President of the European Roma & Traveller Forum, accusing her of downplaying problems and excluding critical voices. In 2008 Vuolasranta was forced to pay a fine after Lumberg accused her of defamation of character.

Lumberg was a candidate for the Left Alliance in the Finnish Parliament elections in 2007 and in 2009 to European Parliament.

References

1956 births
Living people
20th-century Finnish women artists
21st-century Finnish women artists
Finnish painters
Finnish Kale
Finnish writers
Left Alliance (Finland) politicians
People from Lappeenranta
Romani painters
Romani politicians
Romani writers
Finnish people of Romani descent
Finnish LGBT writers
Aalto University School of Arts, Design and Architecture alumni